Dipankar Ghosh (born 26 November 1943) is an Indian former cricketer. He played two first-class matches for Bengal between 1964 and 1969.

See also
 List of Bengal cricketers

References

External links
 

1943 births
Living people
Indian cricketers
Bengal cricketers